Bobby Lewis (1925–2020) was an American R&B and rock and roll singer.

Bobby Lewis may also refer to:

Bobby Lewis (basketball, born 1946), American basketball player, UPI All-American; South Carolina State College graduate
Bobby Lewis (basketball, born 1945), American basketball player, for NBA teams; University of North Carolina graduate
Bobby Lewis (country singer) (born 1942), American country music singer-songwriter
Bobby Lewis (baseball) (1929–1995), American baseball coach

See also
Robert Lewis (disambiguation)